Canal+ (formerly Cyfra+  (Canal+ Cyfrowy), nc+, Platforma Canal+) is a Polish satellite platform, owned and operated by French media company Canal+ Group. From 3 September 2019 nc+ is now Platforma Canal+.

History 
On 1 November 2011 it was announced, that from now ITI group and Canal+ group are now cooperating.

Cyfra+ 

By 2010, Cyfra+ had 1.6 million subscribers.

nc+ 
On 21 March 2013 Cyfra+ merged with the competing platform n to form nc+.

Platforma Canal+ 
On 3 September 2019, nc+ rebranded as Platforma Canal+.

External links

References 

Direct broadcast satellite services
Television networks in Poland
Telecommunications companies of Poland
Platforma
Polish companies established in 1998
Telecommunications companies established in 1998